The Epcot Resort Area (also known as the Epcot - Hollywood Studios Resort Area) is the area between Epcot and Disney's Hollywood Studios  at the Walt Disney World Resort which consists of six individual resorts, five of which are interconnected via footpaths and waterways surrounding a large central lake known as Crescent Lake.

Disney resorts
Disney's Yacht Club Resort 
Disney's Beach Club Resort
Disney's BoardWalk Inn 
Disney's Caribbean Beach Resort
Star Wars: Galactic Starcruiser

Vacation Club villas
Disney's BoardWalk Villas
Disney's Beach Club Villas
Disney's Riviera Resort

Non-Disney resorts
Walt Disney World Dolphin – part of the Walt Disney World Collection of resorts, but operated by Sheraton Hotels and Resorts
Walt Disney World Swan – part of the Walt Disney World Collection of resorts but operated by Westin Hotels & Resorts
The Walt Disney World Swan Reserve – part of the Walt Disney World Collection of resorts but operated by Autograph Collection

Access to parks
Guests staying at any of the resorts in the Epcot Resorts Area have access to the International Gateway, a side entrance to Epcot's World Showcase. The entrance is located directly east of Disney's Beach Club Resort. It is accessible either by walking or by boarding a short Friendship water launch at Disney's Yacht Club Resort, Disney's BoardWalk Resort, Walt Disney World Swan and Dolphin or at Disney's Hollywood Studios. For guests staying at Disney's Caribbean Beach Resort and Disney's Riviera Resort the International Gateway is accessible via Disney Skyliner. The International Gateway entrance offers a full service park entry gate, park exit, ticket windows, locker rentals, wheelchair/stroller rentals, and a gift shop. The International Gateway and canal is located between the United Kingdom and France pavilions.

In addition to the special Epcot entrance, guests at the same resorts also have access to the entrance of Disney's Hollywood Studios by walking or Friendship boat. However, the walking and boating distances from the closest Deluxe Resorts (respectively, Disney's Boardwalk and the Swan and Dolphin) to the park are significantly longer and require walking a road bridge. For guests staying at Disney's Caribbean Beach Resort and Disney's Riviera Resort Disney's Hollywood Studios is accessible via Disney Skyliner.

Magic Kingdom, Disney's Animal Kingdom, Disney Springs, Disney's Typhoon Lagoon and Disney's Blizzard Beach are accessible via bus from all resorts in this area.

See also
Animal Kingdom Resort Area
Disney Springs Resort Area
ESPN Wide World of Sports Resort Area
Magic Kingdom Resort Area

External links

Disney's Official Resorts Web Page

Hotels in Walt Disney World Resort